The Petroleum Trail is an international tourist trail which runs from Poland to Ukraine  linking places associated with the petroleum industry of the 19th century.

Background

During the mid 19th and early 20th centuries, significant oil reserves were discovered and developed in Galicia near Drohobych and Boryslav, The first European attempt to drill for oil was in Bóbrka, Krosno County, Western Galicia, in 1854. By 1867, a well at Kleczany was drilled to about 200 meters using steam. On December 31, 1872, a railway line linking Borysław (now Boryslav) with the nearby city of Drohobycz (now Drohobych) was opened. American John Simon Bergheim and Canadian William Henry McGarvey came to Galicia in 1882. In 1883, their company, MacGarvey and Bergheim, bored holes of 700 to 1,000 meters and found large oil deposits. In 1885, they renamed their oil developing enterprise the Galician-Karpathian Petroleum Company, headquartered in Vienna, with McGarvey as the chief administrator and Bergheim as field engineer, and built a huge refinery at Maryampole near Gorlice, in the southeast corner of Galicia. 

Considered the biggest, most efficient enterprise in Austria-Hungary, Maryampole was built in six months and employed 1,000 men. Subsequently, investors from Britain, Belgium, and Germany established companies to develop the oil and natural gas industries in Galicia. This influx of capital caused the number of petroleum enterprises to shrink from 900 to 484 by 1884, and to 285 companies manned by 3,700 workers by 1890. However, the number of oil refineries increased from thirty-one in 1880 to fifty-four in 1904. By 1904, there were thirty boreholes in Borysław of over 1,000 meters. Production increased by 50% between 1905 and 1906 and then trebled between 1906 and 1909 because of unexpected discoveries of vast oil reserves of which many were gushers. By 1909, production reached its peak at 2,076,000 tons or 4% of worldwide production. Often called the "Polish Baku", the oil fields of Borysław and nearby Tustanowice accounted for over 90% of the national oil output of the Austria-Hungary Empire. From 500 residents in the 1860s, Borysław had swollen to 12,000 by 1898.  At the turn of the century, Galicia was ranked fourth in the world as an oil producer. This significant increase in oil production also caused a slump in oil prices. A very rapid decrease in oil production in Galicia occurred just before the Balkans conflicts.

Galicia was the Central Powers' only major domestic source of oil during the Great War.

Sanok County
 Zarszyn – glycol and methanol storage for natural gas mining
 Strachocina – underground gas storage, structure of the old mine
 Sanok – exposition of the 19th-century oil industry related structures in Skansen – Open Air Museum
 Tyrawa Solna – preserved structure of a mine and pumping jack
 Wielopole – buildings of the office, boiler – room, waiting room for miners

History
1866 – Set up of oil production centres: Witryłów-Hłomcza, Polana, Łodyna-Brzegi, Zagórz, Rajskie, Stara Wieś, Głębokie, Turze Pole, Wielopole, Mokre, Tokarnia, Grabownica. 
1928 – Discovery of Strachocina natural gas reservoir. 
1924 – 1939 – Galician Petroleum Society "Galicja" drills on area of Jurowce, Strachocina.
1930s – oil and natural gas are produced among others in: Grabownica, Strachocina, Turze Pole, Stara Wies, Humniska, Wańkowa, Ropienka, Polana, Wielopole. 
September 1939 – "Beskiden Erdöl Gewinnungs – Geselschaft", renamed for "Karpaten Oil" infill drills of reservoirs: Wielopole, Mokre, Grabownica. 
October 9, 1944 – Creation of the State Petroleum Office, which form letter Nr15 establish "... the highest organising unit of mining district – Sector Sanok ..." 
1946 – Beginning of rotary method in drilling. 
1953 – Creation of drilling company – Sanok.

Old postcards

See also
 Ignacy Łukasiewicz

Notes

References 

 The Petroleum Trail ( also,  and)
Królewskie Wolne Miasto Sanok, official website 
Bobrka, Krosno district, Poland

History of the petroleum industry
Hiking trails in Poland
Tourism in Ukraine